Rendall Munroe (born 1 June 1980 in Leicester, England) is a retired English super bantamweight boxer. Munroe currently resides in Leicester. He is also a former holder of the EBU and Commonwealth Super Bantamweight titles. His dayjob as a binman is well publicised as his nickname is 'The Boxing Binman'. He and his corner men also come out wearing fluorescent yellow binman jackets. Munroe attended English Martyrs Catholic School.

Amateur career
Munroe had an amateur record of 30–10.

Early professional career
Munroe had his first professional fight in September 2003, when he stopped journeyman Joel Viney in the third round at the Harvey Hadden Leisure Center in Nottingham. After 10 wins, he challenged Andy Morris for the British featherweight title and lost a 12-round decision in Edinburgh. Munroe's first title win came three fights later when he beat Marc Callaghan for the vacant English super bantamweight title. In an interview for Boxing News, Munroe said that he faced the toughest man to date so far during his career in this period, the David Kiilu.  Munroe said "He taught me a boxing lesson but I came through with grit and determination"

European and Commonwealth champion
Munroe shot to fame when he upset the form book and defeated touted Kiko Martínez, again at the Harvey Hadden. The win was all the more surprising as in his previous fight, Martínez had knocked out Bernard Dunne in one round. Since the win, Munroe has defended three times against Salem Bouaita, Arsen Martirosian, and Fabrizio Trotta.

On 27 February 2009, Munroe faced Martínez for the second time after Martínez had been installed as the mandatory challenger. The early and middle rounds were fairly close with little to choose between the two fighters but late on Munroe took control and won a unanimous decision.

On 2 May 2009, Munroe captured the Commonwealth Boxing Council title with a points victory over Isaac Nettty. On 23 April 2010, Munroe stopped world number three-rated Victor Terrazas in the ninth round of an eliminator to challenge World Boxing Council super bantamweight world champion Toshiaki Nishioka for his title, which he lost by unanimous decision on 24 October 2010 at the Sumo Hall in Tokyo, Japan, with all three judges scoring the fight 119–109.

To fight Nishioka, Munroe was forced to relinquish both his European and Commonwealth titles.

On 17 January 2011, Munroe received an Honoured Citizen Award in his home city of Leicester,
from Lord Mayor Colin Hall, in recognition of his work in promoting the city. Munroe, who had previously been promoted by Frank Maloney, signed an 18-month deal in March 2011 with Hatton Promotions for forthcoming fights, the first being at the MEN Arena where Munroe captured the vacant WBA international super bantamweight title with a unanimous decision over Andrei Isaeu on 16 April 2011.

Munroe fought against Scott Quigg for the interim WBA super bantamweight title at the Manchester Velodrome on 16 June 2012. However, the fight was ruled a technical draw in the third round after Munroe suffered a cut over his right eye from an accidental head butt. They both want a rematch.

On 13 December 2012, Munroe announced his retirement from the sport at a press conference at King Power Stadium. But he made a return to the ring on 12 May 2013. After a first-round stoppage of Laszlo Fekete, he is still aiming to become a world champion.

References

External links
 
 Rendall Munroe Profile at BritishBoxing.net
 

1980 births
Living people
Boxers from Leicester
English male boxers
Super-bantamweight boxers
English people of Jamaican descent